Venality is a vice associated with being bribeable or willing to sell one's services or power, especially when people are intended to act in a decent way instead. In its most recognizable form, venality causes people to lie and steal for their own personal advantage, and is related to bribery and nepotism, among other vices.
Though not in line with dictionary definitions of the term, modern writers often use it to connote vices only tangentially related to bribery or self-interest, such as cruelty, selfishness, and general dishonesty.

Context 
Venality in its mild form is a vice notable especially among those with government or military careers. For example, the Ancien Régime in France from the 1500s through the late 1700s, was notorious for the venality of many government officials. In these fields, one is ideally supposed to act with justice and honor and not accept bribes. That ensures that the organization is not susceptible to manipulation by self-interested parties.

In contrast to the previous interpretation, dishonesty is not specifically expressed in the literal meaning, but is often implied. The condition of failing to act justly is not a literal component of the word's meaning either. By definition, committing "venal" acts does not indicate "stealing" or "lying", but rather suggests a consensual arrangement, perhaps without conscience or regard for consequences, but is not synonymous with stealing. While bribery could be related, nepotism clearly has no literal similarity or correlation with venality. Though venality is generally used as a pejorative term, an individual or entity could be venal (or mercenary) and not be corrupt or unethical. One could perform one's duties or job in a perfunctory manner in order to collect a wage or payment, or prostitute one's time or skills for monetary or material gain, without necessarily being dishonest.

Much contemporary use of the words venal or venality is applied to modern professional athletes, particularly baseball, basketball, American football, and soccer players all around the world. The implication being that the highly paid players are essentially "hired guns" with no allegiance to any team or city, and are motivated solely by the acquisition of material wealth.

In revolution and other moral panics 

For people to accept settlements and legislation, the acts of the government must be seen as just. This perception enhances the legitimacy of the government. Venality is a term often used with reference to pre-revolutionary France, where it describes the then-widespread practice of selling administrative positions within the government to the highest bidder, especially regarding the Nobles of the Robe.

Thus, for example, venality was a charge for which, in part, Danton and others were executed during the Reign of Terror.

References

Human behavior
Corruption